Tolaga Bay is both a bay and small town on the East Coast of New Zealand's North Island located 45 kilometres northeast of Gisborne and 30 kilometres south of Tokomaru Bay.

The region around the bay is rugged and remote, and for many years the only access to the town was by boat. Because the bay is shallow, a long wharf – the second longest in New Zealand (600m) after the Tiwai Point wharf at Bluff (1,500m) – was built in the 1920s to accommodate visiting vessels. The last cargo ship to use the wharf loaded a cargo of maize in 1967.

The town is a popular holiday spot. Its population is predominantly Māori, a centre of the Te Aitanga-a-Hauiti hapū and home of Ariki – Te Kani a Takirau and Tohunga – Rangiuia.

Geography
The Ūawa River reaches the Pacific Ocean in the middle of Tolaga Bay. There is a bar at the river mouth with around 2 metres of water at high tide. The Ūawa River is called the Hikuwai further up. Tributaries include the Waiau and the Mangaheia. In 2018 heavy rains washed huge amounts of discarded forestry timber (or slash) down the Ūawa River, which choked up the estuary, covered the beach, and caused extensive damage to farms and houses.

An island in the bay was originally named Spöring Island by Cook, after his expedition's assistant naturalist and instrument maker, Herman Spöring, a Finnish botanist. It is however today again known by its Māori name, Pourewa.

Parks

Uawa Reserve is the settlement's local sports ground.

Demographics
It is part of the wider Wharekaka statistical area.

Tolaga Bay had a population of 831 at the 2018 New Zealand census, an increase of 81 people (10.8%) since the 2013 census, and an increase of 21 people (2.6%) since the 2006 census. There were 294 households, comprising 423 males and 414 females, giving a sex ratio of 1.02 males per female, with 222 people (26.7%) aged under 15 years, 132 (15.9%) aged 15 to 29, 357 (43.0%) aged 30 to 64, and 120 (14.4%) aged 65 or older.

Ethnicities were 26.7% European/Pākehā, 86.6% Māori, 4.3% Pacific peoples, 1.1% Asian, and 0.4% other ethnicities. People may identify with more than one ethnicity.

Although some people chose not to answer the census's question about religious affiliation, 46.6% had no religion, 36.1% were Christian, 5.4% had Māori religious beliefs and 0.7% had other religions.

Of those at least 15 years old, 66 (10.8%) people had a bachelor's or higher degree, and 159 (26.1%) people had no formal qualifications. 54 people (8.9%) earned over $70,000 compared to 17.2% nationally. The employment status of those at least 15 was that 258 (42.4%) people were employed full-time, 87 (14.3%) were part-time, and 48 (7.9%) were unemployed.

Wharekaka statistical area

Wharekaka had a population of 1,851 at the 2018 New Zealand census, an increase of 123 people (7.1%) since the 2013 census, and a decrease of 63 people (−3.3%) since the 2006 census. There were 660 households, comprising 945 males and 906 females, giving a sex ratio of 1.04 males per female. The median age was 37.9 years (compared with 37.4 years nationally), with 465 people (25.1%) aged under 15 years, 297 (16.0%) aged 15 to 29, 867 (46.8%) aged 30 to 64, and 222 (12.0%) aged 65 or older.

Ethnicities were 49.6% European/Pākehā, 64.2% Māori, 2.9% Pacific peoples, 0.6% Asian, and 1.6% other ethnicities. People may identify with more than one ethnicity.

The percentage of people born overseas was 5.8, compared with 27.1% nationally.

Although some people chose not to answer the census's question about religious affiliation, 51.1% had no religion, 34.5% were Christian, 3.6% had Māori religious beliefs, 0.2% were Buddhist and 1.5% had other religions.

Of those at least 15 years old, 213 (15.4%) people had a bachelor's or higher degree, and 324 (23.4%) people had no formal qualifications. The median income was $26,900, compared with $31,800 nationally. 180 people (13.0%) earned over $70,000 compared to 17.2% nationally. The employment status of those at least 15 was that 687 (49.6%) people were employed full-time, 219 (15.8%) were part-time, and 81 (5.8%) were unemployed.

History

Tolaga Bay was named by Lt. James Cook in 1769. Described as "an obvious corruption of a Maori name", the exact derivation of the name is unclear. It may have been a misunderstanding of "teraki" or "tarakaka", referring to the local south-westerly wind rather than the place. The original Māori name is Uawa Nui A Ruamatua (shortened to Uawa), and some local residents now refer to the area as Hauiti, and themselves as Hauitians from the local hapū Te Aitanga-a-Hauiti.

At the time of Cook's visit, according to Anne Salmond, here "a famous school of learning (Known as Te Rawheoro) that specialized in tribal lore and carving was sited..."  Tupaia, the Raiatean navigator accompanying Cook since Tahiti, met with the tohunga, priest, of this whare wananga.  Tupaia exchanged news of the "Māori island homelands, known to Māori as 'Rangiatea' (Ra'iatea), 'Hawaiki' (Havai'i, the ancient name for Rai'iatea), and 'Tawhiti' (Tahiti)."  The Māori viewed Tupaia as a tohunga, and many children born during his visit bore his name.  Additionally, Tupaia made a sketch within the rock shelter of Opoutama ('Cook's Cove' or 'Tupaia's Cave'), according to Joel Polack.

In the 1830s there was a thriving flax trade involving early European traders like Barnet Burns. By 1998, the wharf had deteriorated and was in danger of being closed. In response, the Tolaga Bay Save the Wharf Trust raised funds and gained technical help to restore it. The wharf has now been re-opened and the refurbishment project finished in May 2013.

Marae

Two marae are located south of the main township:
 Te Rawheoro Marae and Te Rawheoro meeting house is a meeting place of the Ngāti Porou hapū of Ngāti Patu Whare, Te Aitanga a Hauiti and Ngāti Wakarara.
 Hauiti Marae and Ruakapanga meeting house is a meeting place of the Ngāti Porou hapū of Ngāi Tutekohi, Ngāti Kahukuranui and Te Aitanga a Hauiti.

Three marae are located north of the main township:
 Puketawai Marae and Te Amowhiu meeting house is a meeting place of the Ngāti Porou hapū of Te Whānau a Te Rangipureora.
 Hinemaurea ki Mangatuna Marae and Hinemaurea meeting house is a meeting place of Ngāti Kahukuranui, a hapū of Te Aitanga-ā-Hauiti.
 Ōkurī Marae and meeting house is a meeting place of the Ngāti Porou hapū of Ngāti Ira and Ngāti Kahukuranui.

In October 2020, the Government committed $5,756,639 from the Provincial Growth Fund to upgrade 29 Ngāti Porou marae, including Te Rawheoro Marae, Hauiti Marae, Puketawai Marae and Hinemaurea ki Mangatuna Marae. The funding was expected to create 205 jobs.

Education

Te Kura Kaupapa Māori o Mangatuna is a Year 1–8 Māori immersion school with a roll of 

Both schools are co-educational. Rolls are as of

References

External links
 
 "Tolaga Bay History" personal site
 "Gisborne & Eastland"
 Gisborne District Council

Bays of the Gisborne District
Populated places in the Gisborne District